Bizineh Rud may refer to:
 Bizineh Rud District
 Bizineh Rud Rural District